Gondomar is a municipality located in the east of Portugal's Porto Metropolitan Area and 7 km from central Porto. The population in 2011 was 168,027, in an area of 131.86 km². Gondomar's mayor is Marco Martins.

Gondomar is well known for its jewelry industry, and its name can be traced, like many other toponyms of Northern Portugal, to a prominent Visigothic figure of his day, the King Gundemar.

Demographics

Cities and towns
Cities are:
 Gondomar (1991) 
 Rio Tinto (1995)
 Valbom (2005)

Parishes
Administratively, the municipality is divided into 7 civil parishes (freguesias):
 Baguim do Monte
 Fânzeres e São Pedro da Cova
 Foz do Sousa e Covelo
 Lomba
 Melres e Medas
 Rio Tinto
 Gondomar (São Cosme), Valbom e Jovim

Sports

The town has one association football team called Gondomar who currently play in the Campeonato de Portugal, the third tier of Portuguese football.

Notable people 
 João de Sahagún (1668–1730) a Roman Catholic prelate, Bishop of São Tomé e Príncipe, 1709–1730
 Isabel Santos (born 1968 in Valbom) a Portuguese politician and Member of the European Parliament since 2019.

Sport 
 Pedro Barbosa (born 1970) a Portuguese retired footballer with 422 club caps and 22 for Portugal
 Rómulo Filipe Cunha da Silva (born 1976), known as Rómulo, a Portuguese former footballer with 506 club caps 
 Daniel Materazzi (born 1985) a footballer with over 320 club caps 
 Ricardo Filipe da Silva Braga (born 1985) known as Ricardinho a Portuguese futsal player who has played over 300 games and 160 for Portugal
 André Castro (born 1988), known as Castro, a Portuguese footballer with over 360 club caps

References

External links 

 http://www.cm-gondomar.pt/

 
Cities in Portugal
Municipalities of Porto District
Populated places in Porto District